San Mattia alle Grazie or San Mattia was a church dedicated to Saint Matthias on via delle Grazie in Brescia, Italy, between the corso Garibaldi and the church of Santa Maria delle Grazie - it was named after that church, but they were never otherwise linked. It was founded between 1250 and 1300 and was suppressed in 1797 after the French invasion. It now houses the gym for the neighbouring secondary school.

References 

13th-century establishments
1797 disestablishments
Romanesque architecture in Brescia
Roman Catholic churches in Brescia
Former churches in Italy
13th-century Roman Catholic church buildings in Italy